Zinc finger protein RFP is a protein that in humans is encoded by the TRIM27 gene.

This gene encodes a member of the tripartite motif (TRIM) family. The TRIM motif includes three zinc-binding domains, a RING, a B-box type 1 and a B-box type 2, and a coiled-coil region. This protein localizes to the nuclear matrix. It interacts with the enhancer of polycomb protein and represses gene transcription. It is also thought to be involved in the differentiation of male germ cells. Fusion of the N-terminus of this protein with the truncated C-terminus of the RET gene product has been shown to result in production of the ret transforming protein.

Interactions
TRIM27 has been shown to interact with PRAM1 and EIF3S6.

References

Further reading